Switzerland competed at the 1988 Summer Paralympics in Seoul, South Korea. 41 competitors from Switzerland won 35 medals (12 gold, 12 silver and 11 bronze), and they finished 21st in the medal table.

See also 
 Switzerland at the Paralympics
 Switzerland at the 1988 Summer Olympics

References 

1988
1988 in Swiss sport
Nations at the 1988 Summer Paralympics